Pietro Serantoni (12 December 1906 – 6 October 1964) was an Italian football midfielder and manager.

Club career
Born in Venice, Serantoni played for Società Sprotiva Calcio Venezia, Internazionale (1928–1934), Juventus (1934–1936), A.S. Roma (1936–1940) and Suzzara.

He won two Italian titles, with Inter in 1930 (the club's first ever Serie A championship) and with Juventus in 1936.

International career
Serantoni played 16 matches with the Italy national team, and they won the 1933–35 Central European International Cup and the 1938 FIFA World Cup.

Honours

Club
Inter-Ambrosiana
Serie A: 1929–30
Juventus
Serie A: 1934–35

International
Italy
 FIFA World Cup: 1938
 Central European International Cup: 1933-35

References

1906 births
1964 deaths
Footballers from Venice
Italian footballers
Italy international footballers
Association football midfielders
Serie A players
Venezia F.C. players
Inter Milan players
Juventus F.C. players
A.S. Roma players
Calcio Padova players
1938 FIFA World Cup players
FIFA World Cup-winning players
Italian football managers
Calcio Padova managers
A.S. Roma managers